Pierre Barthès and Nikola Pilić were the defending US Open men's doubles tennis champions, but did not defend their title as a team.

Seventh-seeded John Newcombe and Roger Taylor won the title by defeating sixth-seeded Stan Smith and Erik van Dillen  6–7, 6–3, 7–6, 4–6, [5-3] in the final.

Seeds

Draw

Finals

Top half

Section 1

Section 2

Bottom half

Section 3

Section 4

References

External links
 Association of Tennis professionals (ATP) results archive
1971 US Open – Men's draws and results at the International Tennis Federation

Men's Doubles
US Open (tennis) by year – Men's doubles